The 2011 World Group II Play-offs were four ties which involved the losing nations of the World Group II and four nations from the three Zonal Group I competitions. Nations that won their play-off ties entered the 2012 World Group II, while losing nations joined their respective zonal groups.

Belarus vs. Estonia

 Note: This match broke the Fed Cup record for the most decisive win, with Estonia winning only thirteen games.

Japan vs. Argentina

 Note: This tie was scheduled to be played 16 April and 17 April 2011, but was postponed due to the 2011 Tōhoku earthquake and tsunami

Slovenia vs. Canada

Switzerland vs. Sweden

References

See also
Fed Cup structure

World Group II Play-offs